Samuele Modica (born 5 July 1991) is an Italian professional football player currently playing for Campobasso.

He made his Serie A debut for A.S. Livorno Calcio on 25 April 2010 in a game against Calcio Catania when he came on as a substitute in the 80th minute for Cristian Raimondi.

On 15 July 2010 he was loaned to Viareggio. He only played once in the league and 5 times in the cup.

References

External links
 Football.it Profile 

1991 births
Living people
Italian footballers
Serie A players
U.S. Livorno 1915 players
Association football defenders